Dominique Leurquin is a French guitarist, best known for his collaborations with Luca Turilli; he is a current member of Turilli / Lione Rhapsody, a former member of Luca Turilli's Rhapsody and Luca Turilli's Dreamquest, and a former session member of Rhapsody of Fire.

Personal life 
On 8 October 2012 Luca Turilli's Rhapsody revealed that Leurquin seriously injured his left hand with a circular saw: "After the complicated surgery and everyone around thinking it will be difficult for Dominique to play his beloved instrument once again, the doctors spent some more optimistic words to describe the situation, speaking about a long period of rehabilitation and some major problems eventually related to the thumb only. Therefore it seems there will be again the possibility for Dominique to play a guitar, and maybe sooner than what can be expected." Instead of replacing him for the live shows, Turilli arranged all the songs to add Leurquin's parts on the backing tracks at lower volume.

His return was eventually announced on 9 August 2014, with the band's concert at the Made of Metal Festival on 15 August being his first show with the band.

Discography

Luca Turilli's Dreamquest 
 Lost Horizons (2006)

Luca Turilli's Rhapsody 
 Ascending to Infinity (2012)
 Prometheus, Symphonia Ignis Divinus (2015)

Rhapsody of Fire 
 Live in Canada 2005: The Dark Secret (live, 2006)
 Visions from the Enchanted Lands (live DVD, 2007)

Turilli / Lione Rhapsody 
 Zero Gravity (Rebirth and Evolution) (2019)

Guest appearances 
 Gaia Epicus – Damnation (2008)
 Beto Vázquez Infinity – Existence (2010)

References

Rhapsody of Fire members
French heavy metal guitarists
French male guitarists
Luca Turilli's Rhapsody members
Luca Turilli's Dreamquest members
1965 births
Living people